Shepherd's Bush is an area of west London, England, which has been served by a number of London Underground and commuter rail stations over the past 150 years, many of which have had similar names. The names Shepherd's Bush, Wood Lane and White City have each been used by several separate stations around the Shepherd's Bush district, following a number of station renamings and closures.

Former stations

The first Shepherd's Bush station was opened in 1864 by the Metropolitan Railway and Great Western Railway (GWR) on the Hammersmith & City Railway (now part of the Hammersmith & City line), adjacent to Shepherd's Bush Market. It was closed in 1914 and replaced by two new stations: one to the north, also called Shepherd's Bush (now named Shepherd's Bush Market), and one to the south named .

A station called  opened on the West London Railway in 1869. In about 1905 this route became a branch of the Metropolitan Railway, terminating at Kensington (Addison Road) (now Kensington Olympia). Uxbridge Road station was located at the eastern end of Shepherd's Bush Green, close to the start of Holland Park Avenue. It closed in 1940.

The station was located on the west side of Shepherd's Bush Road (A219) at the junction with Sulgrave Road. It closed in 1916.

The Central London Railway (CLR) opened its subterranean Shepherd's Bush station in 1900, with its entrance overlooking Shepherd's Bush Green, next to the MR's Uxbridge Road station.

The Franco-British Exhibition and the 1908 Summer Olympics brought about the development of the exhibition and events area known as the White City, and two new Underground stations opened to serve these major international events, both named Wood Lane: the CLR Wood Lane station was a sub-surface station located on the eponymous lane, while the Wood Lane Metropolitan station was situated on a viaduct on its Hammersmith branch nearby. The CLR station closed in 1947 and lay derelict until 2008 when it was demolished to make way for the White City bus station. The Metropolitan station was renamed White City in 1947 and finally closed in 1959.

Current stations

In 2008 the arrangement of Shepherd's Bush stations changed when two new stations were opened,  on the West London Line (close to the location of the former Uxbridge Road Metropolitan line station) and  station on the Hammersmith & City line (situated near the former Wood Lane/White City Metropolitan line station). Today, two stations bear the name Shepherd's Bush:  station, on the Central line, and the West London Line Shepherd's Bush station. The two present-day Shepherd's Bush stations are in close proximity and form an interchange between London Underground and National Rail.

With the addition of another station bearing the name Shepherd's Bush, it was decided to rename the Shepherd's Bush station on the Hammersmith & City line (the old 1914 Metropolitan line Shepherd's Bush station) to Shepherd's Bush Market to avoid confusion with the Overground and Central line stations.

None of the 1908 White City exhibition stations now survive and all the stations in the Wood Lane area are newer constructions: the present Central line White City Underground station (opened in 1947 to replace the former Wood Lane station) and the 2008 Wood Lane Hammersmith & City line station.

List of stations

See also
 List of London Underground stations

References

External links
 Shepherd's Bush and White City development

Transport in the London Borough of Hammersmith and Fulham
Shepherd's Bush